Sagebrush scrub is a vegetation type (biome) of mid to high elevation Western United States deserts characterized by low growing, drought resistant shrubs including sagebrush (Artemisia tridentata) and its associates. It is the dominant vegetation type of the Great Basin Desert (Great Basin shrub steppe), occurs along the margins of the Mojave Desert, including in the southern slopes of the Sierra Nevadas and Transverse Ranges of California, and occurs in the Colorado Plateau and Canyonlands region, where it may be referred to as cool desert shrub.

It often occurs adjacent to Pinyon-juniper woodland communities, between 4,000 and 7,000 feet elevation, and where annual precipitation is 8"-15", much falling as snow.

Sometimes it occurs in pure stands of sagebrush, or with associates that vary from region to region. Sagebrush scrub may occur as an understory of pinyon-juniper woodland.

Mojave Desert

In the Mojave Desert, sagebrush associates include saltbrush (Atriplex spp.), rubber rabbitbrush (Ericameria nauseosa), green ephedra (Ephedra vidris), hop-sage (Grayia spinosa), and bitterbrush (Purshia glandulosa).

Sierra Nevada
Sagebrush scrub occurs in relatively deep soils along the Sierra-Cascade axis, running from Modoc County, CA to San Bernardino County, CA.

In the Sierra Nevada range in California sagebrush associates include bitterbrush (Purshia tridentata), curl-leaf mountain-mahogany (Cercocarpus ledifolius), and rabbitbrushes (Chrysothamnus spp., Ericameria spp.).  Average summer temperatures are in the 80's Fahrenheit, and 10-20 degrees F in the winter. It can survive on 7 inches of annual precipitation, so is generally below the Piñon-Juniper Woodland vegetation type, which requires 12 to 20 inches. Its range is 4,200 to 7,000 feet in the Eastern Sierra Nevada range in California.

References

Deserts and xeric shrublands in the United States